The Kerala State Film Award for Best Film is an award presented annually at the Kerala State Film Awards of India to the best film in Malayalam cinema. The awards are managed directly by the Kerala State Chalachitra Academy under the Department of Cultural Affairs of the Government of Kerala.

Winners

See also
 Kerala State Film Award for Second Best Film

References

External links
 Official website
 PRD, Govt. of Kerala: Awardees List
 Manorama News

Film
Awards for best film